Ross railway station was on the Midland Great Western Railway (MGWR) Clifden branch line from .  It served the Martin family and the people of the wider Rosscahill area.

History
The station served the area of Rosscahill and the Martin family.

The station closed with the line in 1935.

References

Notes

Footnotes

Sources

Further reading
 

Disused railway stations in County Galway
Railway stations opened in 1895
Railway stations closed in 1935